Carrigan Township is located in Marion County, Illinois. As of the 2010 census, its population was 380 and it contained 178 housing units.

Geography 
Carrigan Township (T3N R1E) is centered at 38°41'N 89°5'W (89.689, -89.082). It is transversed north–south by U.S. Route 51 and east–west by the North Fork of the Kaskaskia River, on which the Carlyle Reservoir (El. 136 m) is located in the west part of the township.

Demographics

Adjacent townships 
 Patoka Township (north)
 Foster Township (northeast)
 Tonti Township (east)
 Salem Township (southeast)
 Odin Township (south)
 Sandoval Township (south)
 Meridian Township, Clinton County (southwest)
 East Fork Township, Clinton County (west)
 Pope Township, Fayette County (northwest)

References

External links
City-data.com
Illinois State Archives

Townships in Marion County, Illinois
Townships in Illinois